Halfar is a surname. Notable people with the surname include:

Daniel Halfar (born 1988), German footballer
Sören Halfar (born 1987), German footballer
Radomír Halfar, Czechoslovak slalom canoeist

See also
Haldar